The Madrid Metro (Spanish: Metro de Madrid) is a rapid transit system serving the city of Madrid, capital of Spain. The system is the 14th longest rapid transit system in the world, with a total length of 293 km (182 mi). Its growth between 1995 and 2007 put it among the fastest-growing networks in the world at the time, rivaling many Asian metros such as the Mass Transit Railway (Hong Kong), Shanghai Metro, Guangzhou Metro, Beijing Subway, and Delhi Metro. However, the European debt crisis greatly slowed expansion plans, with many projects being postponed and canceled. Unlike normal Spanish road and rail traffic, which drive on the right, Madrid Metro trains use left-hand running on all lines because traffic in Madrid drove on the left until 1924, five years after the system started operating.

Trains are in circulation every day from 6:00 am until 1:30 am, though during the weekends, this schedule is to be extended by one more hour in the morning in 2020. Furthermore, the regional government intends to keep stations opened around the clock during these days from 2023 onwards. It has only stayed open 24 hours during the 2017 World Pride and during the 2021 Madrid snowstorm.

A light rail system feeding the metro opened in 2007 called Metro Ligero ("light metro"). The Cercanías system works in conjunction with the metro, with a majority of its stations providing access to the underground network.

The Madrid Metro has 1,705 escalators and 529 elevators.

History

1916–1918: conception and financing
On 19 September 1916, a royal decree approved the 4-line plan for the creation of the metro of Madrid. The engineers who created the plan, Mendoza, González Echarte, and Otamendi then began the process of raising the 8 million pesetas to begin the first phase of the project, the construction of Line 1 from Sol to Cuatro Caminos. Carlos Mendoza made contact with Enrique Ocharán, the director of Banco de Vizcaya, who offered 4 million pesetas on the condition that the public pledged an additional 4 million.

Mengemor published a brochure in order to persuade people to make donations. The men were able to raise 2.5 million pesetas of the 4 million they needed. King Alfonso XIII intervened and invested 1.45 million pesetas of his own money.

1919: construction and inauguration
The first phase of construction was finished in 1919. It was constructed in a narrow section and the stations had  platforms. The enlargement of this line and the construction of two others followed shortly after 1919. The Madrid metro was inaugurated on 17 October 1919 by King Alfonso XIII.

The king, the royal family, and others, then took part in the first official metro ride which went from Cuatro Caminos to Río Rosas, and took 40 seconds. There they stopped for one minute, before traveling to the Chamberí station which took 45 seconds. The trip went all the way to the end point, Sol. The king and his family then rode the metro back to Cuatro Caminos from Sol, this time without stopping. The journey took 7 minutes and 46 seconds.

After the journey, a lunch was served on the Cuatro Caminos platform, and the engineers were congratulated for creating a "miracle."

Two days later, on 19 October 1919, the Madrid metro was opened to the public. On its first day, 390 trains ran, 56,220 passengers rode the metro, and the company earned 8,433 pesetas in ticket fares.

During November and December 1919, the metro had an average of 43,537 passengers a day and earned an average of 6,530 pesetas a day in ticket sales. Due to their success, the company decided to expand more, and created 12,000 new shares to sell to the public in order to raise more funds to fund further expansion.

1920–1921: expansion of Line 1 and construction of Line 2
The Company then began to gather materials necessary to expand the Line 1 from Sol-Progreso-Antón Martín-Atocha.

On 31 July 1920 the company submitted it proposal to extend Line 1 from Atocha to Puente de Vallecas. In 1921 the company declared its interest in beginning the line from Sol-Ventas, with the first phase of the project being built from Sol-Goya, along Calle Alcalá.

Work began on 27 March 1921 to expand the Line 1 from Atocha to Vallecas, and to begin construction on a line from Sol-Goya.

On 26 December 1921 the Sol-Atocha section of the Line 1 was inaugurated, adding three new metro stops to the line: Progreso, Antón Martín, and Atocha. The king and queen, Don Alfonso XIII and Doña Victoria, attended the inauguration.

1922 and onwards
In 1924, traffic in Madrid switched from driving on the left to driving on the right, but the lines of the Madrid Metro kept operating on the left hand side. In 1936, the network had three lines and a branch line between Ópera and the old Estación del Norte (now Príncipe Pío). All these stations served as air raid shelters during the Spanish Civil War. After the Civil war, the public works to extend the network went on little by little. In 1944, a fourth line was constructed, absorbing the branch of Line 2 between Goya and Diego de León in 1958, a branch that had been intended to be part of Line 4 since its construction but was operated as a branch of Line 2 until construction works had finished.

In the 1960s, a suburban railway was constructed between Plaza de España and Carabanchel, linked to lines 2 (at Noviciado station with a long transfer) and 3. A fifth metro line was constructed as well with narrow sections, but 90 m platforms. Shortly after opening the first section of Line 5, the platforms of Line 1 were enlarged from 60 to 90 m, permanently closing Chamberí station since it was too close to Iglesia (less than 500 m). Chamberí has been closed ever since and was recently reopened as a museum.

In the early 1970s, the network was greatly expanded to cope with the influx of population and urban sprawl from Madrid's economic boom. New lines were planned with larger 115 m long platforms. Lines 4 and 5 were enlarged as well. In 1979, bad management led to a crisis. Works already started were finished during the 1980s and all remaining projects were abandoned. After all those projects,  of rail track were completed by 1983 and the suburban railway had also disappeared since it had been extended to Alonso Martínez and subsequently converted to the new Line 10.

At the beginning of the 1990s, control of the network was transferred to a public enterprise, Metro de Madrid S.A. More large-scale expansion projects were carried out. Lines 1, 4 and 7 were extended and a new Line 11 was constructed towards the outlying areas of Madrid. Lines 8 and 10 were joined together into a longer Line 10 and a new Line 8 was constructed to expand the underground network towards the airport. The enlarged Line 9 was the first to leave the outskirts of Madrid to arrive in Rivas-Vaciamadrid and Arganda del Rey, two satellite towns located in the southeast of Madrid.

This construction included a direct connection between downtown Madrid (Nuevos Ministerios) and the airport, a further extension of Line 8, and adding service to the outskirts with a huge 40 km loop called MetroSur serving Madrid's southern suburbs.

MetroSur, one of the largest ever civil engineering projects in Europe, opened on 11 April 2003. It includes  of tunnel and 28 new stations, with a new interchange station on Line 10, connecting it to the city centre and stations linking to the local train network. Its construction began in June 2000 and the whole loop was completed in less than three years. It connects Getafe, Móstoles, Alcorcón, Fuenlabrada, and Leganés, five towns located in the area south of Madrid.

Most of the efforts of Madrid regional government in 2000s were channeled towards the enlargement of the Metro network. In the 2003–2007 term, President Esperanza Aguirre funded a multibillion-euro project, which added new lines, and joined or extended almost all of the existing metro lines. It brought stations to many districts that had never previously had Metro service (Villaverde, Manoteras, Carabanchel Alto, La Elipa, Pinar de Chamartín) and to the eastern and northern outskirts as well (Coslada, San Fernando de Henares, Alcobendas, San Sebastián de los Reyes). For the first time in Madrid, three interurban light rails (Metro Ligero or ML) lines were built to the western outskirts (Pozuelo de Alarcón, Boadilla del Monte) - mL2 and mL3 - and to the new northern districts of Sanchinarro and Las Tablas - mL1. As a last minute addition, a project on line 8 connected it to the new T4 terminal of Madrid-Barajas Airport.

Future expansion 
Many pending expansion projects were stalled by the economic fallout of the 2008 financial crisis. In recent years, improving the existing network has taken priority over extending it, with major projects like the Plan de Accesibilidad (info board in Príncipe de Vergara) being put into place to enhance accessibility for those with physical disabilities. Currently, there are more than 530 elevators in the system, a number only set to grow with the advancement of the accessibility plan. Additionally, by the end of 2020, the entire network will have gapless cell phone coverage.

As both the number of trips in the Metro and the number of inhabitants of the Comunidad de Madrid have seen steady increases in recent years, there has been a growing political consensus that further extensions are necessary, specifically to support the single central circular Line 6 in a system of mostly radial lines.

Line 11 will be extended by 6.3 kilometers from Plaza Elíptica towards Conde de Casal, both Line 6. Construction is set to start in 2020, with a new bus line interchange to be built at Conde de Casal. The extension will provide access to Lines 1 and 3 as well as Atocha railway station, with a new station Madrid Río to be constructed in the vicinity of the Manzanares.Revised due to Coivd-19, Line 11 is presently planned to terminate near the airport, as opposed ton the plan in 2007 to Avenida de la Ilustración. The planned extension would start construction in 2024 and be operational in 2030.

Under the new regional government, other long-stalled expansion projects have also gained new momentum. This includes the extension of Line 5 to Barajas airport, as well as a connection between Line 3 and MetroSur in the south.

In the context of the Madrid Nuevo Norte project (previously Operación Chamartín), there are plans for the construction of a new metro line from the Chamartín railway terminal with three stations.

A further extension of the Line 11 will extend from Conde de Casal to Valdebebas Norte, which will link to 2 new tunnels at Pueblo Nuevo and Mar de Cristal.

Network map

Downloadable Metro map (English)

Station design and setup
 

The age of many Madrid Metro stations is evident by their design: Older stations on the narrow lines are often quite compact, similar to stations of the Paris Metro. They were decorated with tilings in different colour schemes depending on the station. In recent years, most of these stations have been refurbished with single-coloured plates matching those in the newest ones, alongside other improvements such as modernized signalling technology and elevators. The stations built between the late 70s and the early 90s are slightly more spacious, with most of them having cream-coloured walls.

On the other hand, the most recent stations are built with space in mind, and have natural-like lighting and ample entryways. The colour scheme varies between stations, using single-colored plates and covering the whole station in light colors. Recently built transfer stations have white walls, but this is not the norm.

Most stations are built with two side platforms, but a handful of them (the busiest transfers) have a central island platform in addition to the side platforms theoretically dedicated to exits. This system was originally used on the Barcelona Metro and is called the Spanish solution. The 12 stations with this setup are:

  Miguel Hernández
  Campamento, Carabanchel
  Avenida de América, Manuel Becerra, Sainz de Baranda, Pacífico, Plaza Elíptica, Oporto, Laguna
  Avenida de América, Pueblo Nuevo

Two stations have cross-platform interchange arrangement with two island platforms, which allows extremely fast transfers between lines. Both of these stations are on Line 10, with cross-platform interchanges at Príncipe Pío (with  ) and Casa de Campo (with ). On both occasions, Line 10 uses the outside tracks, so passengers unboarding there leave through the "right" side of the train instead of the usual left side.

In addition, 10 stations are built with just one island platform instead of the usual side platforms. These stations are:

   Pinar de Chamartín (one island platform and two side platforms)
  Almendrales, Villaverde Alto
  Aluche
  Feria de Madrid, Aeropuerto T4
  Rivas Urbanizaciones, Arganda del Rey
  Joaquín Vilumbrales

Another system is where there is one island platform with one side platform. This system is used in two stations on lines 2 and 4 as termini, and three stations on Lines 7, 9, and 10 where it is required for passengers to change to smaller trains to continue their journeys, normally to towns outside Madrid like Alcobendas or Coslada. This is done so the island platform can be used for passengers to change easily between trains. In the latter three stations, the island platform is equipped with fare gates in order for tickets to be validated for travel between fare zones. These stations are:

 Cuatro Caminos
 Argüelles
  Estadio Metropolitano
  Puerta de Arganda
  Tres Olivos

Overhead power supply system

Since 1999 Metro de Madrid has used a patented system for its installations: a solid rail hung from the ceiling of the tunnels, instead of the usual copper or aluminium wire hung from overhead gantries at regular intervals. This type of overhead line is rigid, making it more robust and less prone to failures. Installations outside of tunnels are rare, as they require many more support structures compared to traditional wire based overhead lines, making them more expensive to install. This system of rigid overhead power supply is also used in other metro systems.

Lines

The Metro conventional network has 242 stations on 12 lines plus one branch line, totalling , of which approximately 96% of stations are underground. The only surface parts are between Empalme and west of Eugenia de Montijo; between Lago and north of Casa de Campo; and between south of Puerta de Arganda and Arganda del Rey, for a total of 8 aboveground stations. Additionally, some 30 km of Metro Ligero (light rail) lines across serve the various regions of the metropolitan area which have been deemed not populated enough to justify the extraordinary spending of new Metro lines. Combined, they have 38 stops, of which 4 also connect to the conventional Metro system. Most of the ML track length is on surface, usually running on platforms separated from normal road traffic. However, ML1 line has some underground stretches and stations.

Traditionally, the Madrid metro was restricted to the city proper, but today nearly one third of its track length runs outside the border of the Madrid municipality. Today, the Metro network is divided in six regions:
 MetroMadrid (zone A): the core network inside the Madrid city borders, with over two thirds of the overall length. Also includes light rail line 1.
 MetroSur (zones B1 and B2): line 12 and the last two stations of line 10, Joaquín Vilumbrales and Puerta del Sur. Runs through the southern cities of Alcorcón, Leganés, Getafe, Fuenlabrada and Móstoles.
 MetroEste (zone B1): a prolongation of line 7 from Estadio Metropolitano to Hospital del Henares through the municipalities of Coslada and San Fernando de Henares.
 MetroNorte (zone B1): opened in 2007, includes the stretch of line 10 from La Granja to Hospital Infanta Sofía. Serves the northern outskirts of Madrid and the towns of Alcobendas and San Sebastián de los Reyes. There is a train interchange inside the line at Tres Olivos station.
 MLO (zones B1 and B2): comprised by light rail lines 2 and 3. Connects the towns of Pozuelo de Alarcón and Boadilla del Monte to line 10 at Colonia Jardín station.
 TFM (zones B1, B2 and B3): a prolongation of line 9 from Puerta de Arganda, the first ever outside the borders of Madrid, services the cities of Rivas-Vacíamadrid and Arganda del Rey.
At most of the borders between the regions, one has to switch trains even when staying in the same line, because the train frequency is higher in the core MetroMadrid than in the outer regions.

Madrid also has an extensive commuter train (Cercanías) network operated by Renfe, the national rail line, which is intermodal with the metro network. In fact, 22 Cercanías stations have connections to the Metro network, which is indicated on the official map by the Cercanías logo. Many of the new lines since 1999 have been built to link to or end at Cercanías stations, like the ML2 line, which ends at the Aravaca station providing a fast entry into Madrid though the C-7 or C-10 commuter lines and arriving in only one step to the bus and Metro hub Príncipe Pío.

Notes:
 Line R is a shuttle service (R stands for "ramal" = "branch").
 Old stations are not accessible to people with disabilities but since 1995 all new stations must be accessible by law. Thus, both new stations and renewed old ones have elevators for people on wheelchairs, huge signs for the visually impaired, etc.
 All narrow loading gauge lines except line 5 had originally 60m platforms. Line 1 was the first to have theirs extended to 90m, while line 3 had to wait until the 2000s: prior to its recent extension to the southern district of Villaverde, it was completely closed for nearly a year and thoroughly renewed, and was the first to receive the all-new Construcciones y Auxiliar de Ferrocarriles Series 3000 trains.
 Configurations: M - engine (Motor), R - passive (Remolque), S - cabless engine (motor Sin cabina). Dots/dashes mean crossable/complete basic unit separation, while their absence implies a walkable aisle throughout the joined units.
 Alstom Citadis 302 tramways have one motor "car", one suspended, one with bogie but without motors, one suspended, one motor.
All other lines use  gauge, the only railway using a specific Italian gauge outside of Italy.

Rolling stock

Traditionally, the trains operating in the Madrid Metro have been built and supplied by the Spanish company Construcciones y Auxiliar de Ferrocarriles (CAF). This was particularly true under Francisco Franco's dictatorship, due to the politic of autarky his administration initially pursued. However, despite CAF still working for the Metro, in recent years the Italian AnsaldoBreda has also provided trains for the wide-profile lines.

Every rolling unit in the Madrid Metro has a unique ID that singles it out in the whole network. Those IDs are grouped by the rolling unit model (the "series") and thus is used to categorize the trains, as they bear no user-visible statement of the model specified by the manufacturer. An ID is made up of:
 A letter indicating the type of rolling unit: M for a car with both engines and driver's cabin (Spanish Motor), R for an engineless car, with or without drivers cabin (Spanish Remolque) and S for a cabinless car with engines (Spanish motor Sin cabina).
 A dash separating the two components
 A three or four digit number indicating the unit's series and the position within it. Usually, the series is indicated by the thousands and hundreds (i.e. 5281 indicates a series 5000, subseries 200 train).

Trainsets currently in use

Narrow profile

CAF series 2000: This series has two separate sub-series usually called A and B. The first batch, while reliable and practical, was extremely "box-like" in its looks. They are nicknamed 'Pandas', after a car by Seat with the same name and similar boxy design. In contrast, the B sub-series train sets can be told apart by its sleeker, rounder forms, which has granted them the nickname of "bubble" for their round driver cabin window. Series 2000A are currently the more numerous in the network: 530 cars were built and delivered between 1985 and 1993, having serviced every narrow profile line. They are also among the oldest stock in operation in the Madrid Metro. The most reliable ones are being refurbished and painted with new, lighter colors like the ones used in Series 3000. Series 2000B were delivered in lesser numbers (about 126 cars) between 1997 and 1998, with the inclusion of air conditioning and station announcements through pre-recorded voice messages and LED displays. They are currently used in line 5, with no plans for retirement.

CAF series 3000: The newest of the narrow line trainsets, series 3000 were commissioned for the reopening of line 3 after its complete renewal in the early 2000s. Their constituent subunits can be completely joined through crossable articulations, making it possible to go from the head to the tail without actually exiting the train. This has earned them the nickname of "boa", a term usually applied in Spain to double-length buses with such joints. They are currently servicing lines 2, R, 3, 4 and 5. Series 3000 trains look rather like a narrowed version of series 8000, while the interior uses mainly yellow and light blue tones.

Wide profile

CAF series 5000: Currently servicing line 9 and occasionally line 6, this model has had a long history: the first trainsets were delivered in 1974 for the newly opened, first wide-profile line 7, while the latest subseries, 5500, of which 24 trainsets of 6 cars each were built, entered service in 1993. They were the last to use the old, square "box-like" design from CAF, which was already becoming unpopular for its exaggerate priming of effectiveness versus aesthetics. The first iteration featured a wood lookalike coating for the inner walls and a novel seat distribution in two-seat rows perpendicular to the train walls, making them look not unlike older regional trains. Subseries 5100-5200 returned to the traditional seating along the train walls, but still included another feature from the first iteration, automatic opening of all the gates in the train. The final subseries, 5500, has a distinct, darker color scheme and returns to the usual on-demand opening of train gates with a button on each one. Being the oldest rolling stock in operation in the wide profile lines, many cars were retired or sold to the Buenos Aires Underground for operation on Line B to make up for shortfalls on the line following extensions.

CAF series 6000: This model, of which 29 trainsets were built and delivered in 1998, was the first by CAF to feature a new, sleeker and rounder design. As it was to serve TFM, the stretch of line 9 connecting Madrid to Arganda del Rey (the first extension of the Metro network outside Madrid proper), its interior resembles the regional Cercanías trains more closely than any other Metro trains: compact seats in couples set perpendicularly to the train walls, more places to grasp in case of a sudden brake/acceleration, etc. They were also the first to include luminous panels stating their destination, as the line they service was effectively split in two stretches, and travellers had to switch trains at Puerta de Arganda. Finally, they primed the "boa train" layout, but the walkable aisle only spanned two cars, while a trainset would usually carry 4 or 6. These trains are equipped with automatic train protection (ATP) and automatic train operation (ATO). Series 6000 is currently doing service on line 9b (TFM). In 2013, 73 of the 108 cars ordered were sold to Buenos Aires for operation on Line B of the metro system; the sale totalled €32.6 million for the retirement of Japanese-built units, with a further 13 cars ordered at a later date. These trains have been widely criticised in Argentina, and been called the worst purchase in the history of the Buenos Aires Underground.

Ansaldobreda series 7000 & 9000: The first purchase to a manufacturer other than CAF, and to a non-Spanish dealer, 37 series 7000 trainsets service the extremely busy line 10. They were the first in the network to feature a full "boa" layout, allowing commuters to traverse the whole six cars. They are extremely functional, with ample 1.3m doors and a sleek, unobtrusive design for a total capacity of 1,260 people per trainset (180 seated). This model also features two TV screens in each car, but they are left unused, both regularly or in emergencies. Series 9000 trains are similar to their previous incarnation, but include better accessibility for disabled people and more safety measures, such as visual and auditive warnings for the train gates and more effective emergency brakes, they also brought small aesthetic changes like the removal of the wood effect from the ceiling and the change of the red top stripe of the doors to a blue color. Series 7000 currently service the main part of line 10 from Puerta del Sur to Tres Olivos and occasionally on line 9; while series 9000 comprise the main fleet of line 7 and 12, occasionally on line 10, and on line 9 to cover for the sold 6000s.

CAF series 8000: Originally designed for the MetroSur line 12, 45 trainsets were built and delivered by CAF in 2002. Each one is composed of three cars or four cars joined in the "boa" layout, with the three car version servicing line 12 and the four car version servicing line 8 as-is, while line 9 & line 10 services use two such trainsets to form a MRM-MRM configuration for a maximum of 1,070 passengers (144 seated). The interior distribution is rather like that of series 7000, with a bigger clear area (i.e. without seating) in the first car for people carrying luggage to/from the airport and disabled people in wheelchairs. Like the narrower series 3000 trainsets, its bogies are insonorized and feature a hybrid rubber-pneumatic suspension system. Series 8000 primed the introduction of regenerative braking in the Madrid Metro. The system reverses the normal circuit of the electric motors when braking, thus making the deceleration return power to the network. Also, they feature the now-standard informative panels and gate activity warnings in the interior. A second batch was ordered for line 11 to replace the series 3000 operating on the line since the extension of the line to La Fortuna in 2010. The original batch currently services lines 12 and 8, while also providing rush hour support to lines 9 and 10 whilst the second batch currently services line 11.

CAF series 8400: Derived from the recent series 8000 trains, the 8400 series are the newest train type to enter service on the Madrid Metro on line 6 since 2010 to complement the older series 5000 serving on that line. It currently services line 6.

Light rail (named Metro Ligero)

Alstom Citadis 302: The vehicles serving the light rail lines are low-floor articulated trams in a five-section "boa" configuration, which allows for a maximum of about 200 passengers per tram (60 seated). They can reach a top speed of 100 km/h (65 mph), but in practice they are limited to 70 km/h (45 mph) in most track stretches, and even less in urban sprawls. The tram features a bell-like proximity warning that is activated when the train approaches a station or a level crossing with pedestrians, which has given rise to complaints from people living near the tracks because of the noise generated. Safety features also include door activity warnings for passengers and emergency brakes comparatively more effective than in any other train dedicated to Metro service, as the trams, though remaining in their own lanes separated from other traffic, can cross roads and populated areas.

Currently, Metro Ligero has four lines, although one of them is located outside of the city of Madrid in its entirety:

 Metro Ligero 1/Line ML-1: Pinar de Chamartín - Las Tablas: 5,4 km and 9 stations, 5 of which are underground.
 Metro Ligero 2/Line ML-2: Colonia Jardín – Estación de Aravaca: 8,7 km and 13 stations, 3 of which are underground. 
 Metro Ligero 3/Line ML-3: Colonia Jardín – Puerta de Boadilla: 13,7 km and 16 stations, 1 of them is underground - and is shared with ML-2.
 Metro Ligero 4/Line ML4: Tranvía de Parla: 8,3 km and 15 stations.

Historic rolling stock

Until the early 1990s and the transfer of the Metro system to the Autonomous Community of Madrid, the rate of investment in the network by the central government was extremely low, and thus very old trains were used way beyond their intended lifespans. Particularly loathed was the case of line 5, which was serviced by the nearly 40-year-old series 300 and 1000 from CAF. It was not uncommon that a child would ride to school on the same train his/her parents took decades earlier. Some renewals, along with the purchases of series 2000A and 5000, were started by the socialist regional government of Joaquín Leguina, but in 1995 the People's Party took over the government with the promise to widely extend and improve the Metro service. New lines were built and old ones refurbished: line 5 service was disturbed for several years as some stations at a time were closed and refitted, while line 3 was closed for two consecutive summers in order to expand its platforms to 90 m. Then, new rolling stock was also requested: 1998 saw the arrival of the first CAF series 2000B, retiring the infamous series 1000. Initially the better-preserved series 300 were refitted and painted in the new blue-white color scheme (from the old red corporate image), but they were also retired with the arrival of more series 2000B and, finally, series 3000.

Fares

The Madrid Metro network is split into the six "functional" zones mentioned above. Each one has a "single" ticket (Billete Sencillo), valid for one trip within the zone, and a 10-trip ticket for a comparatively lower price. When crossing zone boundaries, one has to buy a new ticket for the zone being entered. There is also a "combined" ticket, which provides for a single trip between any two points of the network except the Airport stations, which have an additional supplement of €3. All in all, it is possible to go from the airport to any other point of the network for up to €5.00. All tickets are issued on the Tarjeta Transporte Público.

Also, the Consorcio Regional de Transportes (Regional Transportation Authority) has a division of its own, with geographic zones named A through C2. This body sells monthly and annual passes for unlimited trips within their zone of validity, and also a range of Tourist Passes for 1, 3, 5 or 7 days. All of them are accepted at the Metro stations within their zones, and passengers using a CRT pass do not have to pay the airport supplement.

Operators
The metro is operated by its own company, under the Department of Public Works, City Planning, and Transportation of the autonomous community of Madrid. The passage between Puerta de Arganda (Line 9) and Arganda del Rey (Line 9) is operated by Transportes Ferroviarios de Madrid (TFM), while the second and third lines of Metro Ligero are operated by Metro Ligero Oeste (MLO). All of Madrid's rapid transit systems are members of the Consorcio Regional de Transportes, which sells monthly passes for unlimited use of the metro, bus and commuter train networks within the area covered by the pass.

Exhibitions
Some underground stations are large enough to hold public events, such as the three-day fitness festival in May 2011, which attracted 2,600 visitors. Ópera station contains a 200-square-metre archaeological museum.

Various metro stations show contemporary art. The exhibition 100 años de Metro (100 years of Metro) has received more than 27,000 visitors. At Expometro within the Retiro station, multiple exhibitions of modern art have been on display, such as the exhibition by Pablo Sycet, Rafael Arellano, Tono Carbajo, Christian Domec and Julio Juste called The Dream of Madrid, 1986, or "The Passengers" by Daniel Garbade (2000). Both platforms of the station exhibit murals by Antonio Mingote. The Goya station shows works by Francisco Goya (1746–1828) on two murals on the platforms of line 2.

Tribute

On 17 October 2019, Google celebrated the 100th anniversary of Madrid Metro with a Google Doodle.

See also
 List of metro systems

Notes

References

External links

 
 Schematic map of the Metro network
 Madrid at UrbanRail.net
 Consorcio Regional de Transportes de Madrid
 Andén 1 – Association of friends of Madrid Metro
 User guide, ticket types, airport supplement and timings
 Network map (real-distance)
 Madrid Metro Map

 
Rail transport in Madrid
Underground rapid transit in Spain
Rapid transit in Spain
1445 mm gauge railways